Alecto Cycling Team  is a UCI Continental team founded in 2010 that is based in the Netherlands. It participates in UCI Continental Circuits races since 2015.

Major wins
2017
Stage 3 Tour du Loir et Cher, Arvid De Kleijn
ZODC Zuidenveld Tour, Rick Ottema
Antwerpse Havenpijl, Arvid De Kleijn
Kernen Omloop Echt-Susteren, Robbert de Greef
Stage 2 Olympia's Tour, Patrick van der Duin
Stage 1 Tour of Iran (Azerbaijan), Koos Jeroen Kers
2018
Stage 4 Tour of Iran (Azerbaijan), Sjors Dekker
2019
Slag om Norg, Coen Vermeltfoort

Team roster

References

UCI Continental Teams (Europe)
Cycling teams based in the Netherlands
Cycling teams established in 2013